Viviane "Sucuri'  Pereira (born August 8, 1993) is a Brazilian mixed martial artist and competes in strawweight division. She last competed for Invicta Fighting Championships. A professional mixed martial artist since 2013, Pereira has also fought in the UFC.

Background
Pereira started MMA training in a social project and decided to pursue a career as a fighter, after her first win.

Pereira was kicked off her team after informing her coach that she was pregnant with his child, which she gave birth to in December 2020. The father of the child, Marcos Batista, who runs the Dragon Kombat team in Fortaleza, blocked her from all means of communication and kicked her out of the gym she trained at, while continuing to avoid judicial intimations by not showing up to court. Pereira had been dating Marcos since she was 15, after beginning to train with him around the age of 12.

Mixed martial arts career

Early career
Pereira started her professional MMA career in 2013, where she took fights in her native Brazil, notably for Xtreme Fighting Championships, ASPERA Fighting Championship, Bitetti Combat and LIMO Fight Combat. She amassed a record of 11-0 prior to being signed by UFC.

Ultimate Fighting Championship
Pereira made her promotional debut on December 10, 2016 at UFC 206 against Valérie Létourneau in Toronto, Canada. She scored more points than Létourneau and earned her first UFC win via split decision.

On June 3, 2017 Pereira faced Jamie Moyle at UFC 212. After three rounds, the judges award the win to Pereira via unanimous decision.

Pereira faced Tatiana Suarez on November 11, 2017 at UFC Fight Night: Poirier vs. Pettis. She lost the fight via unanimous decision, the first loss of her MMA career.

Pereira faced Yan Xiaonan, replacing injured Nadia Kassem on June 23, 2018 at UFC Fight Night 132. She lost the fight via unanimous decision and was subsequently released from the promotion.

Invicta FC
On August 9, 2018, Pereira announced that she had signed a multi-fight contract with Invicta Fighting Championships.

On October 9, 2018, it was announced that Pereira replaced Heather Jo Clark  on short notice to face Mizuki Inoue at Invicta FC 32: Spencer vs. Sorenson on November 16, 2018. At the weigh-ins, Inoue weighed in at 116.4 pounds, 0.4 pound over the strawweight non-title fight limit of 126. She fined 25 percent of her purse, which went to her opponents Pereira and the fight proceeded to a catchweight bout. Pereira lost the fight via unanimous decision.

Pereira then moved down to atomweight division, facing Alesha Zappitella at Invicta FC 35: Bennett vs. Rodriguez II on June 7, 2019. However, Pereira missed weight by 0.7 pounds and was fined 25 percent of her fight purse. Pereira won the fight via unanimous decision.

Championships and accomplishments

Mixed martial arts
 Xtreme Fighting Championships
 Xtreme Fighting Championships International Strawweight Champion (One time) vs. Vanessa Guimaraes 
 ASPERA Fighting Championship
ASPERA Fighting Championship Strawweight Champion (One time) vs. Carolina Karasek
 LIMO Fight
LIMO Fight Strawweight Champion (One time) vs. Gina Brito Silva Santana
 BITETI COMBAT 
BITETI Combat Strawweight Champion (One time) vs. Poliana Botelho

Mixed martial arts record

|-
|Win
|align=center|14–3
|Alesha Zappitella
|Decision (unanimous)
|Invicta FC 35: Bennett vs. Rodriguez II
|
|align=center|3
|align=center|5:00
|Kansas City, Kansas, United States
|
|-
|Loss
|align=center|13–3
|Mizuki Inoue
|Decision (unanimous)
|Invicta FC 32: Spencer vs. Sorenson
|
|align=center|3
|align=center|5:00
|Shawnee, Oklahoma, United States
|
|-
|Loss
|align=center|13–2
|Yan Xiaonan 
|Decision (unanimous)
|UFC Fight Night: Cowboy vs. Edwards
|
|align=center|3
|align=center|5:00
|Kallang, Singapore
|
|-
| Loss
| align=center| 13–1
| Tatiana Suarez
| Decision (unanimous)
| UFC Fight Night: Poirier vs. Pettis
| 
| align=center| 3
| align=center| 5:00
| Norfolk, Virginia, United States
|
|-
| Win
| align=center| 13–0
| Jamie Moyle
| Decision (unanimous)
| UFC 212
| 
| align=center| 3
| align=center| 5:00
| Rio de Janeiro, Brazil
|
|-
| Win
| align=center| 12–0
| Valérie Létourneau
| Decision (split)
| UFC 206
| 
| align=center| 3
| align=center| 5:00
| Toronto, Ontario, Canada
|
|-
| Win
| align=center| 11–0
| Carolina Karasek
| Decision (unanimous)
| Aspera Fighting Championship 42
| 
| align=center| 3
| align=center| 5:00
| São Paulo, Brazil
|
|-
| Win
| align=center| 10–0
| Vanessa Guimarães
| Submission (armbar)
| XFC International 12
| 
| align=center| 3
| align=center| 4:08
| São Paulo, Brazil
|
|-
| Win
| align=center| 9–0
| Vuokko Katainen
| Decision (unanimous)
| XFC International 10
| 
| align=center| 3
| align=center| 5:00
| São Paulo, Brazil
|
|-
| Win
| align=center| 8–0
| Liana Ferreira Pirosin
| Decision (unanimous)
|XFC International 9
| 
| align=center| 3
| align=center| 5:00
| São Paulo, Brazil
||
|-
| Win
| align=center| 7–0
| Fernanda Priscila Barros Pinheiro
| TKO (punches)
| XFC International 7
| 
| align=center| 1
| align=center| 3:22
| São Paulo, Brazil
|
|-
| Win
| align=center| 6–0
| Gina Brito Silva Santana
| Submission (armbar)
| Limo Fight 13
| 
| align=center| 1
| align=center| N/A
| Limoeiro do Norte, Brazil
|
|-
| Win
| align=center| 5–0
| Poliana Botelho
| Decision (unanimous)
| Bitetti Combat 20
| 
| align=center| 3
| align=center| 5:00
| Rio de Janeiro, Brazil
|
|-
| Win
| align=center| 4–0
| Nicleide Machado
| TKO (punches)
| Bitetti Combat 19
| 
| align=center| 1
| align=center| N/A
| Manaus, Brazil
|
|-
| Win
| align=center| 3–0
| Duda Yankovich
| TKO (punches)
| Bitetti Combat 18
| 
| align=center| 2
| align=center| 2:49
| Rio de Janeiro, Brazil
|
|-
| Win
| align=center| 2–0
| Ilara Joanne
| TKO (punches)
| Ox MMA
| 
| align=center| 2
| align=center| 2:39
| Fortaleza, Brazil
|
|-
| Win
| align=center| 1–0
| Rosy Duarte
| Decision (split)
| Sobral Extreme Fight 6
| 
| align=center| 3
| align=center| 5:00
| Sobral, Brazil
|
|-

See also
 List of female mixed martial artists

References

External links
 
 Viviane Pereira at Invicta FC

1993 births
Living people
Brazilian female mixed martial artists
Strawweight mixed martial artists
Mixed martial artists utilizing boxing
Mixed martial artists utilizing wrestling
Mixed martial artists utilizing Brazilian jiu-jitsu
Brazilian practitioners of Brazilian jiu-jitsu
Female Brazilian jiu-jitsu practitioners
Sportspeople from Ceará
People from Tauá
Ultimate Fighting Championship female fighters